William Frederick Stelling (born 30 June 1969), better known as Billy Stelling, is a former South African-born Dutch cricketer who played fifteen ODIs. An allrounder, he bowls right arm fast medium and is a right-handed batsman who was born at Johannesburg.

Aside from cricket he is also an accomplished mountainbiker, taking part in over 50 mountain bike stage races. In 2016 he and partner Lourens Luus won the Trans Baviaans ultra marathon race of 231 km.

He has also finished 2nd and 4th in his age group at South African Marathon championships in 2012 and 2021 respectively and earned Western Province  cycling colours.

Domestic career
He has been a much-traveled player, starting his career at Western Province in his native South Africa, before moving on to play for Boland. Three seasons were then spent in English county cricket from 1999 to 2001, where he played for Berkshire and Leicestershire.

International career
Stelling first played for The Netherlands in 1995 as an overseas player in the Nat West Trophy. He qualified to represent his adopted country in international competition in 2005, playing in the ICC Trophy that year. In an ODI against Canada in December 2006 he scored a match winning 34-ball 39 in a thrilling runchase.

At the 2007 Cricket World Cup, he took 3 of the first 4 wickets to fall against Scotland, finishing with 3 for 12 off 8 overs and the man of the match award.

Beyond cricket
In 2016, Stelling won the Trans Baviaans 230 km endurance MTB Race with his teammate Lourens Luus.

References

1969 births
Living people
Dutch cricketers
Netherlands One Day International cricketers
Boland cricketers
Cricketers at the 2007 Cricket World Cup
Leicestershire cricketers
Cricketers from Johannesburg
South African expatriate sportspeople in England
South African people of Dutch descent
Western Province cricketers
Berkshire cricketers
Alumni of St Stithians College
University of Cape Town alumni